Number Six is the central character in the 1967–1968 television series The Prisoner. The unnamed character in the original TV series was played by series co-creator Patrick McGoohan. For one episode, "Do Not Forsake Me Oh My Darling", Number Six was portrayed by Nigel Stock due to McGoohan being away filming the movie Ice Station Zebra.

In the AMC remake, Number Six is played by Jim Caviezel; in the Big Finish Productions audio series of 2019, Number Six is voiced by Mark Elstob.

Biography
Much of Number Six's background is kept a mystery during the series, including his name, his job and whom he worked for. In the first episode, it is stated that he was born on 19 March 1928 (the same date as McGoohan's birthday), and that he held a position of some responsibility with the British government, but the exact nature of his job is not known. Certain clues though can be determined from some episodes where Number Six knows and appears to have worked for people in British Intelligence.

Life before The Village
During the episode "Once Upon a Time", Number Six undergoes an intense form of brainwashing and interrogation in which his mind is reverted to that of a child, and he is made to relive major events of his life.

Among these events presented is the suggestion that, as a young man, Number Six caused a fatal car accident due to speeding. It is also suggested that he attended some sort of private school and was once punished for not telling the headmaster about some of his friends' rule-breaking activities. Later in the episode, it is also stated that Number Six was a bomb-aimer during "the War." It was also established that Number Six worked for a British banking firm before being enrolled in a top secret government job.

Other episodes suggest that he was a spy or similar operative, though director Alex Cox stated in his 2017 book I Am (Not) A Number: Decoding The Prisoner that he was in fact a rocket engineer who resigned from his work because he felt his research was being misused. He is shown to be highly sagacious, if not a genius, with tremendous proficiency and expertise in subjects ranging from fencing, boxing and marksmanship to mathematics, languages, astronomy and craftsmanship.

Prior to his capture and internment in the Village, he was engaged to be married to Janet Portland, the daughter of his superior, Sir Charles Portland.

Ultimate fate
In the final episode, "Fall Out", Number Six and several other residents appear to have escaped the Village. However, his ultimate fate is not revealed, and McGoohan repeatedly maintained in interviews that Number Six does not have his freedom. The last shot of the series is of Angelo Muscat entering No. 6’s house and the door automatically opening and closing for him, like in the village.

Adaptations and remakes of Number Six

Shattered Visage
In the late 1980s, DC Comics published Shattered Visage, a four-issue comic book based on The Prisoner, with events taking place twenty years after the television series. It was illustrated by Mister X creator Dean Motter and co-written with Mark Askwith.

In the mini-series, Alice Drake is shipwrecked on the shores of the Village and meets an older Number Six, the single resident of the Village.

Shattered Visage received mixed reviews, with many complaints stemming from the contradictions present in the comics when compared to the television series.

2009 mini-series 
The Prisoner was remade in a 2009 mini-series produced by AMC with Jim Caviezel playing the part of Number Six. Despite receiving mixed reviews, the remake was nominated for several awards, including an Emmy for Outstanding Lead Actor in a Miniseries or a Movie and Outstanding Cinematography for a Miniseries or a Movie.

Fan theories

John Drake
Many fans of The Prisoner believe that Number Six is really John Drake, the secret agent character that McGoohan played in Danger Man, which aired prior to The Prisoner. McGoohan has always denied the theory, and in a 1966 interview in The Los Angeles Times, he stated that "John Drake of Secret Agent (as Danger Man was known in the US) is gone." Furthermore, McGoohan stated in a 1985 interview that Number Six is not the same character as John Drake, adding that he had originally wanted another actor to portray the character.

However, script editor George Markstein, who co-created the series with McGoohan, always claimed that Number Six is John Drake. According to Markstein, he conceived The Prisoner as a sequel of Danger Man when McGoohan resigned from the role.

Official novels based on the series also make this connection, specifically those written by Thomas Disch and David McDaniel, though these are generally not considered canonical. McDaniel's novel refers to Number Six as "Drake" from its very first sentence: "Drake woke."

While John Drake and Number Six look identical and have the same moral integrity, profession, skills, and mannerisms, some differences are noteworthy. Drake is a less emotional, more restrained character while Number Six has a tendency to be outraged and furious as well as superior and condescending. Drake is a regular smoker and drinker while Number Six smokes only twice in The Prisoner and claims to rarely drink.

Number 93
In the opening moments of the 2009 mini-series, Michael, the amnesiac who would be known in that series as Six, discovers an old man in the middle of the desert being fired upon by security forces in some kind of an escape attempt.  The old man is dressed in Number Six's trademark black sweater jacket with white trim, now displaying a badge that identifies the wearer as "93." 93's final words were "Listen to me: tell them all that I got out… be seeing you." Six later explores 93's apartment, which is identical to Number Six's from the original series. Producer Trevor Hopkins stated on a ComiCon panel that he had invited Patrick McGoohan to play the role of 93; McGoohan declined, suggesting that he could play Two instead (the role of Two went to Ian McKellen).

In popular culture
Patrick McGoohan both directed and starred in the Columbo episode “Identity Crisis”, playing an undercover operative disguised as an advertising executive.  Several times during the episode McGoohan’s character says goodbye to people with the phrase “be seeing you.”
The Simpsons episode "The Computer Wore Menace Shoes", parodies The Prisoner, with McGoohan reprising his role as Number Six and Homer Simpson as Number Five.
Number Six, played by Tricia Helfer, is a character on the television series Battlestar Galactica. According to Battlestar Galactica: The Official Companion, it is a tribute to the original character.
In the second volume of the Tales of the Shadowmen series, Xavier Mauméjean's short story, entitled "Be Seeing You!", has Sherlock Holmes in the role of the original Number Six.
Several Iron Maiden songs allude to the original series. In the song, "The Prisoner", lines from the original series are played at the beginning of the song. The Village is also the backdrop of the song, "Back in the Village" along with the lyrics: I don't have a number, I'm a name!
In the Fringe episode entitled "Letters of Transit", Walter Bishop says loudly "I am not a number! I'm a free man!"
In the Battle Angel Alita sequel series, Last Order, main character Alita is confronted by Sechs, German for "Six," who is a clone of Alita during her TUNED years. Sechs, in turn, is trying to fight for her freedom and individuality and believes that defeating Alita will grant her that.
In Ready Player One, the army of debt-indentured players belonging to Innovative Online Industries (IOI) is derisively referred to as "Sixers," because each has given up their name in exchange for a number.
In one episode of the 1990s series Nowhere Man the main character, Thomas Veil, is referred to as Number Six when he poses as a candidate for a domestic terrorist organisation which refers to their candidates as numbers.
 UK indie rock act Mansun's second album, the cult classic Six, is heavily inspired by the series as the band's former frontman Paul Draper is a big fan of the show.

References

Television characters introduced in 1967
Fictional British secret agents
The Prisoner characters
Fictional characters without a name

fr:Numéro 6